Svarte pantere: Rebels with a Cause (Black Panthers: Rebels with a Cause) is a Norwegian crime drama and youth film from 1992 directed by Thomas Robsahm. The film is about a group of young and idealistic animal liberation activists who call themselves the "Black Panthers." They live together in a collective in the countryside and engage in illegal activism at night. In the end, they are arrested by the police, and the authorities use the case to blacken both them and the case as much as possible. The leading roles are played by Henrik Mestad, Anneli Drecker, Bjarte Hjelmeland, Guro Sibeko, Bettina Banoun, and Bjørn Sundquist.

Reception
Svarte pantere received a "die throw" of four out of six in Verdens Gang, Arbeiderbladet, and Dagbladet, whereas Aftenposten gave it three.

Cast

 Anneli Drecker as Sonia
 Henrik Mestad as Marius
 Lars Eilert Arentz-Hansen
 Bettina Banoun as Bettina
 Martin Bjørnersen as Roger
 Jan Grønli as a fur farmer
 Bjarte Hjelmeland as Erik
 Aamund Johannesen as a veterinarian
 Lasse Kolsrud as the defense attorney 
 Christine Elise Robsahm as Kristin
 Guro Sibeko as Lise
 Bjørn Sundquist as a police investigator 
 Jan Fredrik Varden as the prosecutor

References

External links 
 
 Svarte pantere at the National Library of Norway
 Svarte pantere at the Swedish Film Database

1992 films
Norwegian crime drama films
1990s Norwegian-language films
Films set in Norway
Films about animal rights